JTE-907 is a drug used in scientific research that acts as a selective CB2 inverse agonist. It has antiinflammatory effects in animal studies, thought to be mediated by an interaction between the CB2 receptor and IgE.

See also 
 JTE 7-31

References 

Cannabinoids
Benzodioxoles
2-Quinolone ethers at the benzene ring
Carboxamides
Japan Tobacco